Chen Xu (born 1 July 1963) is a Chinese politician and the current deputy head of the Chinese Communist Party's United Front Work Department and director of the Overseas Chinese Affairs Office, in office since 2022. Previously she served as the CCP committee secretary of Tsinghua University. She was an alternate member the 19th Central Committee of the Chinese Communist Party and is a member of the 20th Central Committee.

Biography
Chen was born in Baoding, Hebei, on 1 July 1963. In 1981, she was accepted to Tsinghua University, majoring in electronics. After graduation, she stayed and worked at the university. She joined the Chinese Communist Party (CCP) in January 1984. She was named deputy party secretary in February 2006. She moved up the ranks to become vice-president in December 2007 and executive deputy party secretary in June 2009. In December 2013, she was elevated to party secretary of Tsinghua University, a position at vice-ministerial level.

In February 2022, she was transferred to the United Front Work Department and appointed deputy head. In June, she concurrently serves as director of the Overseas Chinese Affairs Office, succeeding Pan Yue.

References

1963 births
Living people
People from Baoding
Tsinghua University alumni
Academic staff of Tsinghua University
People's Republic of China politicians from Hebei
Chinese Communist Party politicians from Hebei
Members of the 20th Central Committee of the Chinese Communist Party